The name Gil has been used for seven tropical cyclones in the Eastern Pacific Ocean.
 Hurricane Gil (1983)
 Hurricane Gil (1989)
 Tropical Storm Gil (1995)
 Hurricane Gil (2001)
 Tropical Storm Gil (2007)
 Hurricane Gil (2013)
 Tropical Storm Gil (2019)

The name Gil has also been used for one tropical cyclone in the Western Pacific Ocean.
 Tropical Storm Gil (1998) (T9816, 25W)

The name Gil has also been used for a fictional hurricane.
 Hurricane Gil (The Golden Girls, Empty Nest and Nurses)

Pacific hurricane set index articles
Pacific typhoon set index articles